Sirkazhi Govindarajan (19 January 1933 – 24 March 1988) was an Indian Tamil Carnatic vocalist and a leading playback singer of Indian cinema.

Early life 
Govindarajan, was born on 19 January 1933 at Sirkazhi (a small town in present day Mayiladuthurai district, Tamil Nadu; famed birthplace of Sambandar, one of the 63 Nayanars of the Saiva faith) to Siva Chidambaram and Avayambal Ammal. At the age of eight,   Govindarajan began to perform at the Tirupurasundari Temple on the occasion of the Gnana Paal Festival.

Musical education 
He graduated from the Tamil Isai College in Chennai (Madras) in 1949 with the degree 'Isaimani'. He also graduated with the Degree of 'Sangeetha Vidwan'. At the same time, he started rigorous training (Gurukulavasam) under his Guru Thiruppampuram Swaminatha Pillai, who was then a Professor at the Central College of Carnatic Music, Madras. Under his tutelage and in-depth study, he gained knowledge of the nuances and intricacies of Indian Music, especially, Classical Carnatic Music. During this period (1951–1952) he won many competitions, conducted by the Sangeetha Vidwat Sabha (Music Academy) and the Rasika Ranjani Sabha.

Collaboration

Music composers
S. V. Venkataraman, S. M. Subbaiah Naidu, S. Rajeswara Rao, S. Dakshinamurthi, V. Dakshinamoorthy, G. Ramanathan, C. N. Pandurangam, Master Venu, K. V. Mahadevan, Kunnakudi Vaidyanathan, G. Devarajan, B. Narasimma Rao, A. Rama Rao, T. Chalapathi Rao, T. G. Lingappa, P. Adinarayana Rao, T. R. Pappa, Ghantasala, Vedha, G. K. Venkatesh, M. S. Viswanathan, T. K. Ramamoorthy, V. Kumar, A. M. Rajah, C. Ramachandra, Ilaiyaraaja, and Shankar–Ganesh, Baburaj

Playback singers
He has sung with other male singers such as M. S. Viswanathan, T. M. Soundararajan, Ghantasala, P. B. Srinivas, S. C. Krishnan, Tiruchi Loganathan, A. L. Raghavan, K. J. Yesudas and S. V. Ponnusamy.

He also sang duets with many female singer such as M. L. Vasanthakumari, P. Leela, K. Jamuna Rani, Jikki, P. Susheela, K. Rani, L. R. Eswari, L. R. Anjali, Soolamangalam Rajalakshmi, Soolamangalam Jayalakshmi, R. Balasaraswathi Devi, N. L. Ganasaraswathi, A. P. Komala, A. G. Rathinmala, T. V. Rathnam, Bangalore A. R. Ramani Ammal, Vani Jayaram, S. Janaki, M. R. Vijaya, Sarala and Rohini.

He sang duets with singing actors such as N. S. Krishnan, T. R. Mahalingam, P. Bhanumathi, S. Varalakshmi and Manorama.

Filmography

Discography

Govindarajan had sung for many leading actors like M. G. Ramachandran, Gemini Ganesan, N. T. Rama Rao, S. S. Rajendran, and R. Muthuraman.

Awards and honours 
He was the recipient of three gold medals (first place) in the austere and hallowed halls of Sangeetha Vidwat Sabha (Music Academy) from Karaikudi Sambasiva Iyer. "Sangeetha Vidwan" Sirkali won all first places in the three categories: Apoorva Krithis of Sri Thyagaraja swamigal, Ragam-Thalam-Pallavi, and Tamil Classical Songs.

He was conferred the Padma Shri award by the Government of India. The Central College of Carnatic Music was the next institution for his musical enrichment.

Govindarajan had also done playback singing in Tamil, Telugu, Kannada and Malayalam films. Madras University conferred a doctorate (Honoris Causa) on him in 1983.

Source: 

 ISAI MANI: 1949 – Degree from Tamil Isai College, Madras
 SANGEETHA VIDWAN: 1951 – Degree from Central College of Carnatic Music, Madras
 ISAI ARASU: 1968 – Kunrakudi Adheenam, Kunrakudi kumari'
 Best Male Playback Singer: 1971 – for songs of Thirumalai Thenkumari
 ISAI KADAL: 1972 – Bharathi Youth Association, Madras
 INNISAI ARASU: 1974 – Tamil Nadu Nalvazhi Nilayam, Madras
 DHARUMAPURA ADHEENA ISAI PULAVAR: 1974 – Adheena Vidwan of Dharumapura Adheenam appointed by Sri Guru Maha Sannidhaanam
 KALAI MAMANI: 1975 – Tamil Nadu Iyal Isai Nataka Manram (State Sangeetha Nataka Academy Award)
 INNISAI VENDHAN: 1976 – Kandan Arts Academy, Madras
 SANGEETHA BHASKARA: 1977 – Sri Shantananda Swami, Sri Bhuvaneswari Adhishtanam, Pudukkottai
 ISAI THILAKAM: 1977 – Sri Thyagaraja Sangeetha Sabha
 ISAI GNANA BHOOPATHI: 1978 – Brittania Hindu Shiva Temple Trust, London
 EZHISAI VENDHAR AND GANAMRITHA VARITHI: 1978 – During Sri Lanka tours
 PERISAIMANI: 1979 – Sangeetha Abhivrithi Sabha, Kuala Lumpur, Malaysia
 IRAI ISAI VENDHAI: 1979 – Seshasayee Paper Mill Temple, Erode
 MIYAN TANSEN AWARD: 1980 – Delhi Drupad Sangam, New Delhi
 Central Sangeet Natak Akademi Award: 1980
 Tamil Isai Mannar: 1981 – New York Tamil Sangam, New York
 Gandharva Geetha Vithakar: 1981 – Ramalingar Pani Manram, Paris, France
 Di Singenden Hersen Von Indien: 1981 – Yoga Center (Germans), Düsseldorf, West Germany
 Tamil Nadu Arasavai Kalaignar: 1981 – At the Bharathiyar Centenary Celebrations
 Isai Perarignar: 1982 – Annual music festival honor from Tamil Isai Sangam, Madras
 Padma Shri: 1983
 ISAI THENDRAL: 1984 – Thyagaraja Swami Aradhana Committee, Tirutani
 INNISAIMANI: 1985 – Guru Gnana Sambandar Iraipani Manram
 GAMBEERA GANA ISAI VENDHAN: 1985 – Arya Vaisya Schools, Madurai
 ARUL ISAI ARIGNAR: 1987 – Mauritius Education and Cultural Tour
 TAMIL ISAIPERARIGNAR: 1987 – Tamil Sangam, Bangalore
 MUTHAMIZH KALAI MAMANI: 1987 – Tamil Sangam, Salem
 ISAIMAMANNAR: 1987 – Bharathidasan Centenary celebrations by Dravidar Kazhagam, Madras
 ISAIPERARUVI: 1987 – Siddhi Vinayakar Temple, Paris, France
 CULTURAL AMBASSADOR: 1987 – Frei Platz Axion-World Peace Conference in Switzerland

Personal life 
His son Sirkazhi G. Sivachidambaram is also a Carnatic singer.

Death 
Govindarajan died on 24 March 1988 in Madras (now Chennai) due to of a massive heart attack. He was aged 55.

References

External links
Article on Seerkazhi Govindarajan in Kalyana Malai
Three Gifted Voices of a Golden Era in My Movie Minutes

1933 births
Recipients of the Padma Shri in arts
Tamil singers
Indian Tamil people
1988 deaths
Male Carnatic singers
Carnatic singers
Tamil Nadu State Film Awards winners
People from Mayiladuthurai district
Tamil playback singers
Kannada playback singers
20th-century Indian male classical singers
Indian male playback singers
Singers from Tamil Nadu
Recipients of the Sangeet Natak Akademi Award